Orinduik Airport  is an airport serving the mining community of Orinduik in the Potaro-Siparuni Region of Guyana.

See also

 List of airports in Guyana
 Transport in Guyana

References

External links
OpenStreetMap - Orinduik
OurAirports - Orinduik
HERE/Nokia - Orinduik
SkyVector Aeronautical Charts

Airports in Guyana